Andrey Moruyev (born 6 May 1970 in Petrozavodsk, Republic of Karelia) is a retired male javelin thrower from Russia. He set his personal best (87.34 metres) on 25 June 1994 in Birmingham.

International competitions

External links 
 

1970 births
Living people
People from Petrozavodsk
Russian male javelin throwers
Athletes (track and field) at the 1996 Summer Olympics
Olympic athletes of Russia
World Athletics Championships athletes for Russia
Sportspeople from the Republic of Karelia